St. Vincent's Private Hospital (SVPH) is a private hospital in Dublin, Ireland.

History
SVPH was founded in 1974 by the Religious Sisters of Charity. The rebuilding of the hospital, to a design by Scott Tallon Walker Architects, was undertaken by John Paul Construction and completed in 2012. It is the largest private hospital in Dublin. SVPH is part of the St. Vincent's Healthcare Group (SVHG), along with St. Vincent's University Hospital and St. Michael's Hospital.

References

External links
 

Private hospitals in the Republic of Ireland
Hospitals established in 1974
Teaching hospitals in Dublin (city)
Catholic hospitals in Europe
1974 establishments in Ireland